Myroslav Ivan Lubachivsky (24 June 1914, Dolyna, Austria-Hungary – 14 December 2000, Lviv, Ukraine), cardinal, was bishop of the Ukrainian Catholic Archeparchy of Philadelphia in the United States and from 1984 major archbishop of Lviv and head of the Ukrainian Greek Catholic Church (UGCC).

Life
He was ordained a priest of the Archeparchy of Lviv in 1938 by Metropolitan Andrey Sheptytsky and then continued his doctoral studies in theology in Austria. After World War II, he was unable to return to Ukraine and emigrated to the United States, where he continued his pastoral work, first as a priest at St. Peter and Paul Church in Cleveland, Ohio, beginning in 1949, and then from 1968 as a teacher at the St. Josaphat Ukrainian Catholic Seminary in Washington. He also taught at St. Basil's College in Philadelphia and St. Basil's Academy in Stamford, Connecticut before being consecrated archbishop of Philadelphia in 1979.

The Ukrainian Holy Synod elected Lubachivsky coadjutor to Cardinal Josyf Slipyj in 1979. Upon Cardinal Slipyj's death in 1984, he took over as head of the UGCC. In 1985, Pope John Paul II gave him the title of Cardinal Priest of S. Sofia a Via Boccea.

Soviet authorities lifted the ban against the Church in 1989, and Lubachivsky along with other leadership of the UGCC officially returned to Lviv from exile on 30 March 1991.

Lubachivsky is buried in St. George's Cathedral in Lviv.

Notes

External links
 Myroslav Ivan Cardinal Lubachivsky bio

1914 births
2000 deaths
People from Dolyna
People from the Kingdom of Galicia and Lodomeria
Ukrainian Austro-Hungarians
University of Innsbruck alumni
Ukrainian cardinals
Bishops in Pennsylvania
Eastern Catholic bishops in the United States
Burials at St. George's Cathedral, Lviv
Cardinals created by Pope John Paul II
Pontifical Biblical Institute alumni
Metropolitans of Galicia (1808-2005)
Eastern Catholic bishops in Ukraine
Eastern Catholic archeparchs in North America
Births in Dolyna